Oberea japonica is a species of beetle in the family Cerambycidae. It was described by Thunberg in 1787.

References

japonica
Beetles described in 1787